Agostino Lanfranchi (24 June 1892 – 15 February 1963) was an Italian bobsledder and skeleton racer who competed from the late 1920s to the early 1940s. Competing in two Winter Olympics, he finished fourth in the men's skeleton event at St. Moritz in 1928, and Lake Placid, New York in 1932, he finished fifth in the four-man event and eighth in the two-man event (misspelled Agostini in the two-man event).

Lanfranchi was part of the clothing empire that developed many buttons and belt buckles for women's fashions during his lifetime. He was also active in motorboat racing, developing events in Venice and Turin.

References
1928 men's skeleton results
1932 bobsleigh two-man results
1932 bobsleigh four-man results
Lanfranchi family profile 
Wallechinsky, David (1984). The Complete Book of the Olympics: 1896-1980. New York: Penguin Books. pp. 558, 560,576.

1892 births
1963 deaths
Italian male bobsledders
Italian fashion designers
Italian motorboat racers
Italian male skeleton racers
Olympic bobsledders of Italy
Olympic skeleton racers of Italy
Bobsledders at the 1932 Winter Olympics
Skeleton racers at the 1928 Winter Olympics